Surprise Lake may refer to:

Places
Canada
Surprise Lake (Roy River), Quebec
Surprise Lake (Vancouver Island), British Columbia
Surprise Lake (Lappe), in Lappe, Ontario

United States
 Surprise Lake (Arizona), Surprise, Arizona
 Surprise Lake (Idaho), Elmore County, Idaho
 Surprise Lake (Washington), Milton, Washington
 Surprise Lake (Teton County, Wyoming), a lake in Grand Teton National Park
 Surprise Lake, a lake in the caldera atop Mount Aniakchak, Alaska

Other uses
 Surprise Lake Camp, a non-profit sleepaway camp in Cold Spring, New York